In Rasa Shastra (the branch that deals with pharmaceutical processing of Ayurveda formulations), Shodhana is a process that is employed during the pharmaceutical processing either to detoxify, purify, or to potentiate the efficacy of the raw materials (of herbal, mineral, metal or animal origin).
Shodhana is of two types in Rasashastra. Samanya or general purification method and Vishesha shodhana or the Specific methods of purification.

References

Ayurveda
Alternative detoxification